Natosha Rogers (born May 7, 1991 in Littleton, Colorado) is a long-distance runner from the United States. She is the 2012 National runner up in the 10,000 meters. Rogers placed 23rd at 2017 IAAF World Cross Country Championships in 34:47.

Prep
Rogers is a Dakota Ridge High School 2009 alumnus.In 2009, Rogers placed 3rd twice, setting personal bests in 5:03.10 (1600m) and 10:50.60 (3200m) on May 16 at Colorado All-Classification State Meet.

Rogers placed top 11 at Colorado High School Activities Association 5A State Cross Country Championships all four years of high school.

NCAA
Rogers won 2012 NCAA 10 km championship in a time of 32:41.63 two days before placing 6th in the 5000 m in 16:20.04 in Des Moines, Iowa.

Natasha Rogers tells her college story on how she overcame injury and focused on what she wanted from her college experience on Off Track: Meeting of the Unknowing Minds podcast on 15 February 2021.

Professional

USA National Track and field Championships

Rogers raced The Track Meet 10,000 m and placed 5th in 31:12.28  on 5 December 2020.

USA Road Championships
Natosha Rogers won 2016 Great Cow Harbor 10 km in Northport, New York in 33:17.2.

Rogers raced Atlanta Track Club half marathon on Atlanta Motor Speedway, finished 2nd behind Molly Seidel in 70:50 on 28 February 2021.

Cross Country
In 2017, Aliphine Tuliamuk-Bolton won 2017 USA Cross Country Championships title defeating Laura Thweatt, Kellyn Taylor, Courtney Frerichs, Sarah Pagano, and Elaina Balouris. Natosha Rogers placed tenth in Bend, Oregon at 2017 USA Cross Country Championships. Natosha placed 23rd at 2017 IAAF World Cross Country Championships in 34:47 helping Team USA to a 5th place finish of 17 teams.

References

External links
 
 Natosha Rogers All-athletics profile
 Natosha Rogers racing profile
 
 

American female long-distance runners
American female middle-distance runners
Living people
1991 births
Track and field athletes from Denver
World Athletics Championships athletes for the United States
21st-century American women
20th-century American women